Gregory Martin Daniels (born June 13, 1963) is an American screenwriter, television producer, and director. He has worked on several television series, including writing for Saturday Night Live and The Simpsons, adapting The Office for the United States, and co-creating Parks and Recreation and King of the Hill. Daniels attended Harvard University, where he befriended and began collaborating with Conan O'Brien. His first writing credit was for Not Necessarily the News, before he was laid off because of budget cuts.

He joined the writing staff of The Simpsons during its fifth season. He wrote several classic episodes, including "Lisa's Wedding", "Bart Sells His Soul", and "22 Short Films About Springfield". He left The Simpsons to co-create another long-running animated series, King of the Hill, with Mike Judge. The show ran thirteen years before its cancellation in 2009. During the run of King of the Hill he worked on several other series, including the American version of The Office and Parks and Recreation. In 2016, he was an executive producer on the TBS series People of Earth. With The Office star Steve Carell, Daniels co-created the Netflix comedy series Space Force. He also created the Amazon science fiction comedy series Upload.

Early life and work
Daniels is the son of Judy, who worked at the New York Public Library, and Aaron Daniels, who was president of ABC Radio Network. He has stated that he became interested in comedy by watching Monty Python's Flying Circus as a child, as well as reading books by humorist S.J. Perelman at age 11. His first joke was a Carnac the Magnificent joke for his father which was later used for The Office episode, "The Dundies".

Daniels attended Phillips Exeter Academy and then Harvard University where he wrote for the Harvard Lampoon with Conan O'Brien. After graduating in 1985, the two accepted jobs at Not Necessarily the News, but they were soon fired due to budget cuts.

Career

Saturday Night Live 
Daniels and O'Brien met Lorne Michaels in late 1987 and were given a three-week try-out in the Saturday Night Live writing staff. While on the staff, Daniels won an Emmy Award for Outstanding Writing for a Variety, Music or Comedy Program. Daniels left the writing staff in 1990.

Seinfeld Season 3: "The Parking Space"

Co-written by Larry David and Greg Daniels. Aired on April 22, 1992.

The Simpsons and King of the Hill (1993–2009)
Daniels joined the writing staff of The Simpsons in 1993. He was hired in the fifth season following the departures of many of the original team of writers. His first day also coincided with O'Brien's last day on the series.

When he initially joined the series, he believed the series had gone past the "glory years" and that he had "missed the boat". In the fifth season, Daniels penned "Homer and Apu", "Secrets of a Successful Marriage", and "The Devil and Homer Simpson" segment of "Treehouse of Horror IV".

Daniels received an Emmy nomination in the "Outstanding Individual Achievement in Music and Lyrics" category for the song "Who Needs The Kwik-E-Mart?" from "Homer and Apu". For season six, he wrote "Homer Badman", "Lisa's Wedding", and the "Time and Punishment" segment from "Treehouse of Horror V". The latter episode became the third of the series to win a Primetime Emmy Award for Outstanding Animated Program. In the seventh season, Daniels wrote "Bart Sells His Soul", which was based on a childhood experience. His final credit for the series was for "22 Short Films About Springfield", which he served as supervising writer alongside show runner Josh Weinstein. They were given the responsibility of linking all the stories together.

Daniels left The Simpsons to work on King of the Hill alongside Mike Judge. Daniels rewrote the pilot script and created several important characters that did not appear in Judge's first draft (including Luanne and Cotton), as well as some characterization ideas (e.g., making Dale Gribble a conspiracy theorist).

Daniels also took the writers to Texas to do some research with reporter notebooks, a process he would use for The Office and Parks and Recreation. Judge was ultimately so pleased with Daniels' contributions that he chose to credit him as a co-creator, rather than give him the "developer" credit usually reserved for individuals brought on to a pilot written by someone else. During the fifth and sixth seasons, Judge and Daniels became less involved with the show. They eventually focused on the show again, although Daniels steadily became more involved with other projects.

The Office and Parks and Recreation (2005–2015)
In 2005, Daniels adapted the popular BBC mockumentary series The Office for American audiences. The series premiered to mixed reviews, so the writers worked to make it more "optimistic" and make the lead character, Michael Scott, more likable. The second season was significantly better received and it was named the second best TV series of 2006 by James Poniewozik, writing that "Producer Greg Daniels created not a copy but an interpretation that sends up distinctly American work conventions ... with a tone that's more satiric and less mordant. ... The new boss is different from the old boss, and that's fine by me." He gave the acceptance speech at the 58th Annual Primetime Emmy Awards when the American version of The Office won the award for Outstanding Comedy Series, and he received an award for Outstanding Writing for a Comedy Series at the 59th Annual Primetime Emmy Awards.

Following the success of The Office, Ben Silverman asked Daniels to create a spin-off for the series. After considering several ideas, Daniels and co-creator Michael Schur eventually decided that the series would not get a spin-off because Daniels and Schur "couldn't find the right fit". After Amy Poehler agreed to play the lead, they decided their new series would revolve around an optimistic female bureaucrat in small-town government. The premise of Parks and Recreation was partly inspired by the portrayal of local politics on the HBO drama series The Wire, as well as the renewed interest in and optimism about politics stemming from the 2008 United States presidential election. The series initially received mixed reviews, much like The Office in the first season, but after a re-approach to its format and tone, the later seasons received critical acclaim. For four years, he split his time between The Office and Parks and Recreation, before eventually returning as full-time showrunner for The Office for its ninth and final season.

Subsequent projects (2012–present) 
In 2011, Daniels made a deal with NBC to produce several series for Universal Television. He also developed the British series Friday Night Dinner for American audiences. The remake was picked up for a pilot, which was written by Daniels and directed by Ken Kwapis, and featured Allison Janney and Tony Shalhoub as the mother and father. The pilot was eventually not picked up for series. He also teamed with Mindy Kaling and Alan Yang to work on two different animated series for NBC and made a deal to executive produce a new pilot written by The Office writer Owen Ellickson and starring The Office cast member Craig Robinson. He served as director and executive producer on the TBS series People of Earth. In January 2019, Netflix announced that he would write and produce a new series called Space Force starring Steve Carell, who was the lead in Daniels' previous sitcom The Office. He created the Amazon original sci-fi series Upload which started streaming in May 2020.

Personal life
Daniels met Susanne Dari Lieberstein while she was Lorne Michaels' assistant at Saturday Night Live and they eventually married. She is the sister of Paul Lieberstein, writer for King of the Hill and the replacement showrunner of The Office for Daniels. Daniels was also the brother-in-law to The Office cast member Angela Kinsey until her divorce from The Office writer Warren Lieberstein in 2010.

Work

Reception
Daniels' work has received mainly positive reception. Out of the six TV series that Daniels has worked on, four of them—Saturday Night Live, The Simpsons, King of the Hill and The Office—were named among Time reviewer James Poniewozik's All Time 100 TV Shows. His work on The Simpsons has received acclaim from critics and fans. Two of his episodes, "Bart Sells His Soul" and "22 Short Films About Springfield", were listed among the show's creative team's top five favorite episodes in 2003. Series creator Matt Groening and executive producer James L. Brooks have named his episodes among their favorites. Other staff members and several critics have praised his work. His other animated series and his first credit as a creator, King of the Hill, has received positive reviews as well. IGN named it the 27th best animated television series, and the site mainly complimented the series for its subtle character humor.

His next television series, The Office, ranked as NBC's highest rated show for a majority of its run, according to the Nielsen ratings. The series has also been put on several top series lists by many publications including Time, BuddyTV, Metacritic, The Washington Post, and Paste. His writing credits for the series are often considered the best of the series. Despite its early acclaim, later seasons have received criticism for a dip in quality, notably after Daniels was less involved. Daniels' next series, Parks and Recreation, has been called "the smartest comedy on TV" by Entertainment Weekly.

Awards
Daniels has been nominated for twenty-one Emmys and has won five. Those wins are for: 

 Outstanding Writing for a Variety, Music or Comedy Program for his work on Saturday Night Live (1989)
 Primetime Emmy Award for Outstanding Animated Program for the Simpsons episode, "Lisa's Wedding" (1995)
 Outstanding Animated Program for King of The Hill (1999)
 Outstanding Comedy Series for The Office (2006)
 Outstanding Writing for a Comedy Series for "Gay Witch Hunt" from The Office. (2007)

Daniels was also awarded Austin Film Festival's Outstanding Television Writer Award in 2008.

Filmography

References

External links
 

1963 births
Living people
American television producers
American television writers
American male television writers
Primetime Emmy Award winners
The Harvard Lampoon alumni
Phillips Exeter Academy alumni
Writers Guild of America Award winners
Showrunners